The Birmingham trolleybus system once served the city of Birmingham, in the West Midlands region of England.

By the standards of the various now-defunct trolleybus systems in the United Kingdom, the Birmingham system was a medium-sized one, even though Birmingham was then, and still is, the most populous British city outside London.

None of the former Birmingham trolleybuses is recorded as having survived.

See also

History of Birmingham
Transport in Birmingham
List of trolleybus systems in the United Kingdom

References

Notes

Further reading

External links
SCT'61 website - photos and descriptions of early Birmingham motorbuses
National Trolleybus Archive
British Trolleybus Society, based in Reading
National Trolleybus Association, based in London

History of Birmingham, West Midlands
Transport in Birmingham, West Midlands
Birmingham
Birmingham